Gujarat Samachar is a Gujarati language newspaper published in the Ahmedabad and 6 other places namely Surat, Baroda, Bhavnagar, Rajkot, Mumbai and USA

Gujarat Samachar is the highest circulated Gujarati newspaper with more than 55 lakhs readers and about 10.5 lakhs circulation mainly in Gujarat and Maharashtra.

References

External links
Official Site
Marathi Site
Online Edition

Gujarati-language newspapers
Mass media of Indian diaspora
Publications with year of establishment missing
Mass media in Ahmedabad